Louis Raymond may refer to:

 Louis Raymond (horticulturalist),  (born 1954), American landscape designer
 Louis Raymond (tennis) (1895 – 1962), South African tennis player
 B. Louis Raymond, 18th-century French composer and conductor